Alatan Gadasu (born 27 January 1984) is a Chinese race walker. He was born in Hure Banner, Tongliao, Inner Mongolia, and began representing Inner Mongolia in Chinese national competitions in 2000, under coach Yang Wenke (杨文科). He went on to join the Chinese national team in 2002.

Achievements

References

External links

1984 births
Living people
Athletes (track and field) at the 2004 Summer Olympics
Chinese male racewalkers
Olympic athletes of China
Athletes from Inner Mongolia
People from Tongliao